Un embrujo is a 1998 Mexican drama film directed by Carlos Carrera. The film was selected as the Mexican entry for the Best Foreign Language Film at the 71st Academy Awards, but was not accepted as a nominee.

Cast
 Blanca Guerra as Felipa
 Mario Zaragoza as Eliseo (adult)
 Daniel Acuña as Eliseo (Young)
 Luis Fernando Peña as Burro
 Ricardo Rentería as Rafael (Young)
 Luisa Huertas as María
 Vanessa Bauche as Magda
 Elpidia Carrillo as Esposa del Brujo

See also
 List of submissions to the 71st Academy Awards for Best Foreign Language Film
 List of Mexican submissions for the Academy Award for Best Foreign Language Film

References

External links
 

1998 films
1998 drama films
1990s Spanish-language films
Mexican drama films
Films directed by Carlos Carrera
1990s Mexican films